The M93 Hornet mine was an American anti-tank mine. It was a wide-area mine, capable of attacking targets up to 100 meters away from its position.

Development
Development of the M93 began in the late 1980s in response to the Warsaw Pact's numerical superiority in armored vehicles over NATO and the Assault Breaker concept to compensate through the use of high-technology standoff weapons.

A development contract was awarded to Honeywell Defense Systems and Textron Inc. in August 1987. In April 1990, Textron was given the contract to complete development of the system.

Following the end of the Cold War and the dissolution of the Soviet Union, the threat to Western Europe by large armored formations was no longer relevant. This, combined with the M93's high unit price of $119,190 (in 1996 dollars), led to the program's termination in 1997 after just 441 units had been produced.

The U.S. Army later pursued a weapon of a similar design in the XM204 Top-Attack Munition in the early 2020s.

Description
The M93 used both seismic and acoustic sensors to track and identify potential targets near the mine. Once the mine detected a suitable target in range, it turned to face the target and elevated the submunition launcher to the correct angle. The submunition was then fired in the direction of the target using a gas generator. An infra-red sensor on the submunition scanned the ground as it travels, searching for the target. When the target was detected the submunition triggered a Misznay Schardin effect warhead that projected a 450 gram tantalum slug, along with a number of smaller fragments downwards towards the target in a top attack.

See also
Land mine
PTKM-1R
XM1100 Scorpion
M7 Spider
XM204 Top-Attack Munition

References

External links
GlobalSecurity.Org: M93 HORNET Family of Wide Area Munitions (WAM)
Federation of American Scientists: M93 HORNET Family of Wide Area Munitions - WAM

Anti-tank mines
Land mines of the United States